A Storm Over Zakopane ( or ) is a 1931 German drama film directed by Domenico Gambino and Adolf Trotz and starring Gambino, Alfons Fryland, and Lilian Ellis. The film was made as a co-production with Poland, with a separate Polish language version directed by Józef Lejtes.

Cast

References

Bibliography

External links 

1931 films
Films of the Weimar Republic
German drama films
German black-and-white films
Polish black-and-white films
1931 drama films
1930s German-language films
Films directed by Domenico Gambino
Films directed by Adolf Trotz
German multilingual films
1931 multilingual films
1930s German films